Phado Saw David Tharckabaw is Vice President and Minister of Foreign Affairs of the Karen National Union (KNU).

David Tharckabaw should not be confused with David Taw, who is the secretary of the KNU Peace Committee and also a member of a KNU delegation that negotiated peace with the Burmese government in January 2012.

References

External links
A long struggle
Saw David Tharckabaw. Responsible for relations with governments, the United Nations, and international NGOs.
Extract from Secret Genocide

1935 births
Burmese rebels
Burmese people of Karen descent
Living people
Burmese activists
Burmese Baptists
People from Kayah State